Mentz is a town in Cayuga County, New York, United States. The population was 2,114 at the 2020 census. The town is in the central part of the county, north of Auburn.The town's name is derived from Mainz, in Germany.

History 

The town was formed in 1802 as the "Town of Jefferson" from the town of Aurelius while still part of Onondaga County. In 1808, it assumed its current name. The first permanent settlers arrived in 1810, although others had attempted to settle the area previously.

In 1837, the community of Port Byron set itself apart from Mentz by incorporating as a village.

The Erie Canal was moved to include the Seneca River in 1856.

In 1859, part of the town was used to form the towns of Montezuma and Throop.

In 1997, town supervisor Bill Jones was convicted of official misconduct and a gun charge, but vanished before his sentencing. He hid in southern Ohio with his girlfriend, at one point living on land owned by Fredericka Wagner, who was implicated in the Pike County shootings. In January of 2021 he was arrested after being taken to a hospital and remanded to New York State.

Notable people
John W. DeGroff, Wisconsin politician, born in Mentz
Isaac Singer, sewing machine manufacturer
Henry Wells, partner in Wells-Fargo
Brigham Young, the Mormon leader, lived briefly in the town

Geography

The northern town line is defined by the Erie Canal (Seneca River). Port Byron and Centerport were ports on the canal until it was moved northward.

The New York State Thruway (Interstate 90) crosses the town, following along the original path of the Erie Canal. New York State Route 31 (east-west) crosses New York State Route 38 at Port Byron.

Demographics

As of the census of 2000, there were 2,446 people, 932 households, and 676 families residing in the town.  The population density was 143.5 people per square mile (55.4/km2).  There were 999 housing units at an average density of 58.6 per square mile (22.6/km2).  The racial makeup of the town was 96.52% White, 0.94% African American, 0.41% Native American, 0.16% Asian, 0.65% from other races, and 1.31% from two or more races. Hispanic or Latino of any race were 1.64% of the population.

There were 932 households, out of which 32.6% had children under the age of 18 living with them, 52.7% were married couples living together, 13.8% had a female householder with no husband present, and 27.4% were non-families. 21.7% of all households were made up of individuals, and 10.3% had someone living alone who was 65 years of age or older.  The average household size was 2.61 and the average family size was 2.99.

In the town, the population was spread out, with 25.8% under the age of 18, 7.8% from 18 to 24, 29.0% from 25 to 44, 23.2% from 45 to 64, and 14.1% who were 65 years of age or older.  The median age was 37 years. For every 100 females, there were 94.6 males.  For every 100 females age 18 and over, there were 93.8 males.

The median income for a household in the town was $34,398, and the median income for a family was $36,637. Males had a median income of $31,500 versus $20,172 for females. The per capita income for the town was $15,494.  About 9.4% of families and 11.8% of the population were below the poverty line, including 12.3% of those under age 18 and 13.5% of those age 65 or over.

Communities and locations in Mentz 
Centerport – A hamlet on the eastern town line and NY-31.
High Bridge – A location in the northwestern part of the town, northwest of Port Byron.
North Port Byron – A hamlet north of Port Byron village on NY Route 38.
Port Byron – The village of Port Byron is at the intersection of NY-31 and NY-38, immediately south of the Thruway. Port Byron grew to prominence as a port on the Erie Canal, but the canal was moved northward during reconstruction.

See also 
Mentz (disambiguation)

References

External links
 Town of Mentz official website

Populated places established in 1802
Towns in Cayuga County, New York
1802 establishments in New York (state)